The Peugeot Type 64 was a model of early automobile manufactured by the French company Automobiles Peugeot between 1904 and 1907. It was powered by an 1817 cubic centimetre v-twin engine making 10 horsepower. It was only constructed in the body style of a small truck (one of the first Peugeots to do so), which had a payload of 1200 kg.

See also 
 List of Peugeot vehicles
 Automotive industry in France

References 

Peugeot vehicles